Albert Hirschfeld (June 21, 1903 – January 20, 2003) was an American caricaturist best known for his black and white portraits of celebrities and Broadway stars.

Personal life
Al Hirschfeld was born in 1903 in a two-story duplex at 1313 Carr Street in St. Louis, Missouri, and moved with his family to New York City in 1915, where he received his art training at the National Academy of Design.

He married chorus girl Florence Ruth Hobby in 1927; the couple separated in 1932 and divorced in 1943. That same year he married actress Dolly Haas. Haas died in 1994, aged 84. They had one child, a daughter, Nina (b. 1945).

In 1996, he married Louise Kerz, a theatre historian (b. 1936).

Career
In 1924, Hirschfeld traveled to Paris and London, where he studied painting, drawing and sculpture.  When he returned to the United States, a friend, fabled Broadway press agent Richard Maney, showed one of Hirschfeld's drawings to an editor at the New York Herald Tribune, which got Hirschfeld commissions for that newspaper and then, later, The New York Times.

Hirschfeld's style is unique, and he is considered to be one of the most important figures in contemporary drawing and caricature, having influenced countless artists, illustrators, and cartoonists. His caricatures were regularly drawings of pure line in black ink, for which he used a genuine crow quill.

Readers of The New York Times and other newspapers prior to the time they printed in color will be most familiar with the Hirschfeld drawings that are black ink on white illustration board. However, there is a whole body of Hirschfeld's work in color. Hirschfeld's full-color paintings were commissioned by many magazines, often as the cover. Examples are TV Guide, Life Magazine, American Mercury, Look Magazine, The New York Times Magazine, The New Masses, and Seventeen Magazine. He also illustrated many books in color, most notably among them Harlem As Seen By Hirschfeld, with text by William Saroyan. 
 

He was commissioned by CBS to illustrate a preview magazine featuring the network's new TV programming in fall 1963. One of the programs was Candid Camera, and Hirschfeld's caricature of the show's host Allen Funt outraged Funt so much he threatened to leave the network if the magazine were issued. Hirschfeld prepared a slightly different likeness, perhaps more flattering, but he and the network pointed out to Funt that the artwork prepared for newspapers and some other print media had been long in preparation and it was too late to withdraw it. Funt relented but insisted that what could be changed would have to be. Newsweek ran a squib on the controversy.

Broadway, film, and more
Hirschfeld started young and continued drawing to the end of his life, thus chronicling nearly all of the major entertainment figures of the 20th century. During his eight-decade career, he gained fame by illustrating the actors, singers, and dancers of various Broadway plays, which would appear in advance in The New York Times to herald the play's opening. Though the theater was his best-known field of interest, according to Hirschfeld's art dealer Margo Feiden, he actually drew more for the movies than he did for live plays. "By the ripe old age of 17, while his contemporaries were learning how to sharpen pencils, Hirschfeld became an art director at Selznick Pictures. He held the position for about four years, and then in 1924 Hirschfeld moved to Paris to work and lead the Bohemian life. Hirschfeld also grew a beard, necessitated by the exigencies of living in a cold water flat. This he retained for the next 75 years, presumably because "you never know when your oil burner will go on the fritz."

In addition to Broadway and film, Hirschfeld also drew politicians, TV stars, and celebrities of all stripes from Cole Porter and the Nicholas Brothers to the cast of Star Trek: The Next Generation. He also caricatured jazz musicians——Glenn Miller, Duke Ellington, Count Basie, Dizzy Gillespie, Billie Holiday, and Ella Fitzgerald—and rockers The Beatles, Elvis Presley, Bruce Springsteen, Bob Dylan, Jerry Garcia, and Mick Jagger.  In 1977, he drew the cover of Aerosmith's Draw the Line album.

Hirschfeld drew many original movie posters, including for Charlie Chaplin's films, as well as The Wizard of Oz (1939). The "Rhapsody in Blue" segment in the Disney film Fantasia 2000 was inspired by his designs, and Hirschfeld became an artistic consultant for the segment; the segment's director, Eric Goldberg, is a longtime fan of his work. Further evidence of Goldberg's admiration for Hirschfeld can be found in Goldberg's character design and animation of the genie in Aladdin (1992). He was the subject of the Oscar-nominated documentary film The Line King: The Al Hirschfeld Story (1996).

Nina
In 1943, Hirschfeld married German actress Dolly Haas. They were married for more than 50 years and had a daughter, Nina.

Hirschfeld is known for hiding Nina's name, written in capital letters ("NINA"), in most of the drawings he produced after her birth. The name would appear in a sleeve, in a hairdo, or somewhere in the background. As Margo Feiden described it, Hirschfeld engaged in the “harmless insanity,” as he called it, of hiding her name at least once in each of his drawings. The number of NINAs concealed is shown by the number written to the right of his signature. Generally, if no number is to be found, either NINA appears once or the drawing was completed before she was born.

For the first few months after Nina's birth, Hirschfeld intended the hidden NINAs to appeal to his circle of friends. But what he hadn't realized was that the population at large was beginning to spot them, too. When Hirschfeld thought that the gag was wearing thin among his friends and stopped concealing NINAs in his drawings, letters to The New York Times ranging from "curious" to "furious" pressured him to begin hiding them again. He said it was easier to hide the NINAs than it was to answer all the mail. From time to time he lamented that the gimmick had overshadowed his art.

In Hirschfeld's book Show Business is No Business, Feiden recounts the following story to illustrate what Hirschfeld meant when he referred to the NINA counting as a harmless insanity: "The NINA-counting mania was well illuminated when in 1973 an NYU student kept coming back to my Gallery to stare at the same drawing each day for more than a week. The drawing was Hirschfeld's whimsical portrayal of New York's Central Park. When curiosity finally got the best of me, I asked, 'What is so riveting about that one drawing that keeps you here for hours, day after day?''' She answered that she had found only 11 of 39 NINAs and would not give up until all were located. I replied that the '39' next to Hirschfeld's signature was the year. Nina was born in 1945."

In his 1966 anthology The World of Hirschfeld, he included a drawing of Nina that he titled "Nina's Revenge". That drawing contained no NINAs. There were, however, two ALs and two DOLLYs ("the names of her wayward parents").

In the Fantasia 2000 segment, the crimp of Duke the Builder's toothpaste tube contained a NINA in tribute to Hirschfeld.

Publications

Al Hirschfeld famously contributed to The New York Times for more than seven decades. His work also appeared in The New York Herald Tribune, The Old World, The New Yorker Magazine, Collier's, The American Mercury, TV Guide, Playbill, New York magazine, and Rolling Stone.

In 1941, Hyperion Books published Harlem As Seen By Hirschfeld, with text by William Saroyan.

Hirschfeld's illustrations for the theater were gathered and published yearly in the books, The Best Plays of ... (for example, The Best Plays of 1958-1959).

Additional collections of Hirschfeld's illustrations include: Manhattan Oasis, Show Business Is No Business (1951), American Theater, The American Theater as Seen by Al Hirschfeld, The Entertainers (1977), Hirschfeld by Hirschfeld (1979), The World of Al Hirschfeld (1970), The Lively Years, 1920-1973 with text by Brooks Atkinson, Hirschfeld’s World (1981), Show Business is No Business with preface and endnotes by Margo Feiden (1983), A Selection of Limited Edition Etchings and Lithographs with text by Margo Feiden (1983), Art and Recollections From Eight Decades (1991), Hirschfeld On Line (2000), Hirschfeld’s Hollywood (2001), Hirschfeld’s New York (2001), Hirschfeld’s Speakeasies of 1932 with Introduction by Pete Hamill (2003), and Hirschfeld’s British Isles (2005).

Hirschfeld collaborated with humorist S. J. Perelman on several publications, including Westward Ha! Or, Around the World in 80 Clichés, a satirical look at the duo's travels on assignment for Holiday magazine. In 1991, the United States Postal Service commissioned him to draw a series of postage stamps commemorating famous American comedians. The collection included drawings of Stan Laurel, Oliver Hardy, Edgar Bergen (with Charlie McCarthy), Jack Benny, Fanny Brice, Bud Abbott, and Lou Costello. He followed that with a collection of silent film stars including Rudolph Valentino, ZaSu Pitts and Buster Keaton. The Postal Service allowed him to include Nina's name in his drawings, waiving their own rule forbidding hidden messages in United States stamp designs.

Hirschfeld expanded his audience by contributing to Patrick F. McManus' humor column in Outdoor Life'' magazine for a number of years.

Collections and tributes

Permanent collections of Hirschfeld's work can be found at a variety of institutions including the Metropolitan Museum of Art, the Museum of Modern Art, and the New York Public Library in New York, Harvard University in Cambridge, and the Harry Ransom Center in Austin, Texas.

Hirschfeld was the recipient of two lifetime achievement Tony Awards. On June 21, 2003, the Martin Beck Theatre on Broadway was renamed the Al Hirschfeld Theatre. Hirschfeld was also honored with a star on the St. Louis Walk of Fame.

In 2002, Al Hirschfeld was awarded the National Medal of Arts. He was an Honorary Member of the Salmagundi Club.

Death
On January 20, 2003, Hirschfeld died of natural causes in his home at 122 East 95th Street in Manhattan. He was survived by his daughter Nina Hirschfeld West, and his third wife, Louise Kerz.

See also
 List of caricaturists
 List of TV Guide covers

Notes

References

External links

 Al Hirschfeld Foundation (official site)
Al Hirschfeld Papers at the New York Public Library
Al Hirschfeld Collection at the Harry Ransom Center
Artist proofs by Al Hirschfeld at the Margaret Herrick Library
Exhibit: The Line King's Library: Al Hirschfeld at the New York Public Library for the Performing Arts - Fall, 2013.
 Exhibit: Al Hirschfeld, Beyond Broadway exhibition at the Library of Congress
 St. Louis Walk of Fame
 Jewish American Hall of Fame

1903 births
2003 deaths
20th-century American artists
21st-century American artists
Album-cover and concert-poster artists
American caricaturists
American stamp designers
Art Students League of New York alumni
Artists from St. Louis
Artists from New York City
Film poster artists
Jewish American artists
Special Tony Award recipients
United States National Medal of Arts recipients
20th-century American Jews
21st-century American Jews
Members of the American Academy of Arts and Letters